L'Assomption station is a former Via Rail station in L'Assomption, Quebec, Canada. It is marked only by a signpost and served as an optional stop for two Via Rail routes running from Montreal, Quebec.

On July 3, 2017, Via Rail ceased serving Ahuntsic and L'Assomption stations, and began serving Sauvé and Anjou stations instead. Both new stations are commuter rail stations operated by the Réseau de transport métropolitain (RTM).

References

External links

Via Rail stations in Quebec
Railway stations in Lanaudière